Jimmie Johnson's Anything with an Engine is a 2011 racing video game for the PlayStation 3, Wii and Xbox 360. The game features NASCAR Sprint Cup Series champion Jimmie Johnson.

Promotion
On August 13, 2011, Johnson competed in the Zippo 200 at the Glen at Watkins Glen International, driving the No. 7 Jimmie Johnson's Anything with an Engine Chevrolet Impala for JR Motorsports. Johnson finished the race in second place.

On November 25, 2011, Johnson appeared on Late Night with Jimmy Fallon to announce the game's first downloadable character, a James Bond-inspired Jimmy Fallon, from which a portion of the download proceeds would be donated to the American Red Cross.  The character can only be acquired in the PS3 and Xbox 360 versions of the game.

References

External links
 

2011 video games
Jimmie Johnson
PlayStation 3 games
Racing video games
Wii games
Xbox 360 games
Multiplayer and single-player video games
Video games based on real people
Video games developed in the United States
Johnson
Johnson